Thomas Clarkson (born 22 February 2000) is an Irish rugby union player who is currently a member of Leinster's academy. He plays as a prop and represents Dublin University in the All-Ireland League.

Early life
Born in Dublin, Clarkson attended Blackrock College and won a Leinster Schools Rugby Senior Cup with the school in 2018, alongside fellow Leinster academy member Liam Turner. After leaving school, he joined Dublin University, the club representing Trinity College Dublin, in the amateur All-Ireland League.

Leinster
Clarkson joined the Leinster academy ahead of the 2019–20 season, and made his senior debut for the province as a 63rd minute replacement for Michael Bent in their 28–10 derby victory against Ulster on 29 August 2020.

Ireland
Ever-present as the team's tighthead prop, Clarkson was a key player for the Ireland under-20s team that won a grand slam during the 2019 Six Nations Under 20s Championship. He also represented the team at the 2019 World Rugby Under 20 Championship, and was vice-captain of the side during the 2020 Six Nations Under 20s Championship, where they secured consecutive triple crown's, though the tournament was cancelled with two rounds still to be played due to the COVID-19 pandemic.

Honours

Blackrock College
Leinster Schools Rugby Senior Cup:
Winner (1): 2018

Ireland Under-20s
Six Nations Under 20s Championship:
Winner (1): 2019
Grand Slam:
Winner (1): 2019
 Triple Crown:
 Winner (2): 2019, 2020

Leinster
Pro14:
Winner (2): 2020, 2021

References

External links
Leinster Academy Profile
Ireland Under-20s Profile

2000 births
Living people
People educated at Blackrock College
Rugby union players from Dublin (city)
Irish rugby union players
Dublin University Football Club players
Leinster Rugby players
Rugby union props